Who Wants to Be a Millionaire Hot Seat was an Indonesian game show based on the original British format of Who Wants to Be a Millionaire?. It premiered on RCTI on Monday, September 13, 2010, at 17.30 (UTC+7). The host was Ferdi Hasan. Despite its name, the top prize was a quarter of a billion Indonesian rupiah, however after September 19, the top prize was increased to half a billion rupiah, and the money tree was changed. It can be earned by answering 15 multiple-choice questions correctly. The only lifeline was pass.

October 31, 2010, was the last day the show aired on RCTI, fueling rumors of cancellation.

Unlike the previous 2 'classic' Millionaire ever aired in Indonesia, this time the format used is the Hot Seat format, similar to the Australian version. Several of the first 5 questions usually have 3 joke answers and 1 correct answer.

Money tree

References

Who Wants to Be a Millionaire?
Indonesian game shows
2010 Indonesian television series debuts
2010s Indonesian television series
2010 Indonesian television series endings
Television series by Sony Pictures Television
2010s game shows